Spiders (also marketed as Spiders in 3D) is a 2013 American 3D science fiction monster horror film directed by Tibor Takács. The film was released on February 8, 2013.

Plot
Debris from a destroyed Soviet space station (where experiments were taking place on huge mutant spiders) fell toward Earth, crashing inside the tunnel of a New York City subway station. The film cuts to the subway station, where Jason Cole, a New York Transit subway supervisor, works. When the debris from the space station crashes into the tunnel, an alarm goes off and the authorities, afraid of a possible disease outbreak, begin evacuating passengers from the station. Jason's coworker Jimmy  descends into the subway tunnel to investigate the area, telling Jason that he believes the debris is the remains of the Russian spacecraft. Jimmy feels something bite his leg, and suddenly starts to stumble, falling on the third rail, electrocuting himself.
 
Meanwhile, at the site of the spacecraft crash, men in hazmat suits investigate for radioactive material.  They find a piece of debris and bring it to a Russian doctor working on-site, who says it is "nothing to worry about."  The authorities declare the area "clear" and safe for reopening the subway station, but Rachel Cole, representing the New York City Department of Health, insists that the "waste disposal issues" be resolved first. One man says they'll do their best to fix it by rush hour. The debris is said to be from the soviet union.

A hospital pathologist has discovered a cluster of large, strange-looking "insect eggs" inside Jimmy's body and gives a sample to Jason in a canister so he can get it to the health department for further study.

Back at the subway station, rats have infested the tunnels. The smell has gotten so bad that the subways were shut back down. Pest control is brought down to the source of the problem, an abandoned subway cart. Near it they find several bodies of homeless men, covered in webs filled with eggs. One of the men is then attacked by hundreds of spiders, which swarm his body.

The authorities quarantine the area, reroute the subways to go around it, and jam cell phone service in the area. They tell the public that there is a "virus outbreak". Men in hazmat suits capture the spiders and put them in a large cage. Back at the morgue, a Dr. Darnoff, working in cooperation with the Russians, examines Jimmy's body and the eggs. He explains that Jimmy's body contained the queen spider egg, which is always implanted in the first host, which was Jimmy. Darnoff explains that 20 years ago, a spacecraft was discovered under the ice.

They took the genes from the aliens found in the craft, and injected it into many different creatures, but spiders were the only ones with the structure to carry the gene and survive. He then explained that the queen spider can weave an infinite supply of lightweight, bulletproof material that will give the nation that controls it a military and industrial advantage. A U.S. Army colonel, Jenkins, who is revealed to be also working with the Russians, tells his men to kill off the people they quarantined. Darnoff tries to save the people by telling Jenkins killing them is no longer necessary, since they already have the queen spider egg.  However, Jenkins tells Darnoff to mind his own business.  The doctor also reveals that if they do not get the queen egg to the nest the spiders are building to protect her, she will die in 12 hours.

Investigators see Rachel's report on the eggs found in the bodies and quarantine her apartment with her daughter Emily inside, saying she is "infected". They try to quarantine Jason as well, but he escapes. When tests are done on the eggs Jason brought to Rachel, it is found that they have no bacteria on them. Which is unusual because "everything on earth has bacteria."

Two men, apparently also working for Darnoff, manage to grab Rachel's purse which contains the canister holding the queen egg, from her car as she leaves her underground garage.

Rachel calls Jason, who tells her to leave her car, as they are now being hunted by the Russians and their cohorts.  Meanwhile, the spiders grow to giant proportions and begin to come up to street level from the subway tunnels.  Jason and Rachel head towards their apartment to rescue Emily.  They travel underground to avoid capture using the subway tunnels that Jason is familiar with, meeting huge and vicious spiders who attack them.  However, they manage to fight off the spiders and reach the apartment, but learn through texting that Emily left and is hiding in a toy store.

Jenkins moves out to capture the queen to acquire her webbing. Darnoff advises him not to, as she is still dependent on the other spiders, but Jenkins ignores him.  Just then, the queen emerges from the ground and eats the doctor, who was in awe of her beauty.

Jason and Rachel make it to the toy store. When they don't find Emily, Jason calls her but receives no answer. They hear her yelling and climb down to the tunnels to find her. They run into more spiders along the way and barricade a door to escape them. They find Emily and begin tearing at the webbing.
They climb up a ladder that leads to the streets but Jason stays behind to fight off the queen who is coming for them. Jason begins breaking the eggs along the walls, which angers the queen. It chases him into a subway train, which it can't fit in due to its size. Jason finds the train's controls and drives it into a tunnel where the spider won't fit. He exits the train after sending it backwards through the tunnel, where the spider is waiting at the opening. The train crashes into the spider and at the same time, smashes gas pipes on the wall, starting a huge fireball that kills the spiders below ground, including the queen.  Jason, Rachel and Emily reunite on the street, where soldiers load dead spiders into a huge truck.

As the final scene slowly fades, a mutant spider is seen crawling across a broken traffic signal, and the film ends.

Cast
Patrick Muldoon as Jason Cole
Christa Campbell as Rachel Cole
Pete Lee-Wilson as Dr. Darnoff
Sydney Sweeney as Emily
Shelly Varod as Phoebe
Jesse Steele as Bill
William Hope as Colonel Jenkins
Atanas Srebrev as Jimmy
Vincenzo Nicoli as Caz
Owen Davis as Apartment Soldier
Jon Mack as Stella
Sarah Brown as Sarah

Production
Filming took place in Bulgaria and director Takács had to create the city of Manhattan "on a studio backlot
that includes several blocks of what looks like Greenwich Village". In order to make some parts of the film more closely resemble Manhattan, particularly the subway scenes, the director brought in some extra set pieces to help enhance the scenes. The spiders were predominantly CGI created, but Takács used a 3-foot-long soldier-spider claw for some shots.

Reception

Spiders 3D holds a 11% approval rating on Rotten Tomatoes, based on nine reviews with an average rating of 3.5/10. Fearnet gave Spiders a negative review, but said that the movie would have some appeal to fans of films akin to Spiders.

References

External links
 

2013 horror thriller films
2013 films
American horror thriller films
2010s English-language films
Nu Image films
Films shot in Bulgaria
Films about spiders
Films directed by Tibor Takács
Films scored by Joseph Conlan
Films set in New York City
American natural horror films
2010s American films